Al Basateen (Arabic:بساتين), is a village in Aley District in the Mount Lebanon Governorate of Lebanon.

Location 

Al Basateen is located in the Chahaar Region overlooking  Beirut. Elevation is about 600 meters (2000 feet) above sea level. It offers beautiful views of the Mediterranean and Beirut. 
Access is easy  from Beirut through Khaldeh and Aramoun.

Information  

Five families constitute the population of about 2000 or so; Ghosn, Rafeh, Abdelsalam, Merhi and Al Alia. Its Head of its municipality is Yaser Ghosn, and the members are: Faisal Rafeh, Ghassan Rafeh, Malika Ghosn, Akram Ghosn, Wissam Rafeh, Haitham Merhi, Katia Rafeh, Rami Rafeh. They were elected in 2016.

External links
Bsatine, Localiban 

Populated places in Aley District